Steinen is an Ortsgemeinde – a community belonging to a Verbandsgemeinde – in the Westerwaldkreis in Rhineland-Palatinate, Germany.

Geography

Steinen lies 5 km from Herschbach and 7 km from Selters on the Westerwald Lake Plateau. In the contest Unser Dorf soll schöner werden - unser Dorf hat Zukunft (“Our village should be lovelier – our village has a future”), Steinen was distinguished several times. It belongs to the Verbandsgemeinde of Selters, a kind of collective municipality. Its seat is in the like-named town.

Politics

The municipal council is made up of 13 council members, as well as the honorary and presiding mayor (Ortsbürgermeister), who were elected in a majority vote in a municipal election on 13 June 2004.

Economy and infrastructure

The community lies right on Bundesstraße 8, leading from Limburg an der Lahn to Siegburg. The nearest Autobahn interchange is Mogendorf on the A 3 (Cologne–Frankfurt). The nearest InterCityExpress stop is the railway station at Montabaur on the Cologne-Frankfurt high-speed rail line.

References

External links
Steinen (Westerwald) 
Verbandsgemeinde of Selters 

Municipalities in Rhineland-Palatinate
Westerwaldkreis